Nettersheim is a municipality in the district of Euskirchen in the state of North Rhine-Westphalia, Germany. It is located in the Eifel hills, approx. 20 km south-west of Euskirchen. The rivers Erft and Urft have their source in the municipality.

Location 
The district of the city Netterheim is built out of the constituent communities (Ortsteile):
 Zingsheim, also administrative headquarters
 Pesch
 Roderath
 Tondorf
 Bouderath
 Buir
 Engelgau
 Frohngau
 Holzmülheim
 Marmagen
 Nettersheim (accordingly)

Education and Culture 
 Kindergarten (5 in city district)
 Family center
 Primary school (2 in city district)
 Secondary school (lower level, Hauptschule)
 House of literature, with included library
 Nature information centrum Eifel
 Archeological park with several information points
 Public education center
 Culture and Art center, located at the old railway station building
 Permanent exhibition, located at town hall (since 2007)
 Art installation, named „Macht der Drei“
 Agricultural museum Nettersheimer Hof
 Wood competence center

Tourism 

In the city of Nettersheim there is a tourist information, which is located at the „Naturzentrum Eifel” building.

Hiking 
Several hiking trails start or pass by Nettersheim, such as:
 Eifelsteig
 Römerkanal-Path
 Jakobsweg
 Eifeler Quellenpfad
 Eifeler Kräuterpfad

Climate

People 
 Horst Lichter (born 1962), German cook, television cook, cookbook author and moderator

References

External links 

 Nettersheim website
 Archeological park
 Cultural association
 Wood competence center

Municipalities in North Rhine-Westphalia
Euskirchen (district)